InnerZone (2002) is the fifth collaborative album by American ambient musicians Steve Roach and Belgian Vidna Obmana, containing a echoes of desert ambience, rhythmic ambience, space music, and electro-tribal ambience.

Reception 
AllMusic rated the album a 4.5 of 5, stating "Vidna Obmana (aka Dirk Serries) and Steve Roach have outdone themselves". In conclusion, he said "This CD is destined to be a classic. It will appeal to all e-music fans."

Track listing

Personnel 
Adapted from Discogs.
 Sam Rosenthal – cover design
 Roger King – mastering
 Steve Roach – mixing
 Steve Roach, Vidna Obmana – music
 Martina Verhoeven – photography

References

External links
 InnerZone at Discogs

2002 albums
Steve Roach (musician) albums
Projekt Records albums